The Pacific Building, also known as the Pacific Desk Building, is a historic building in Albuquerque, New Mexico. Built in 1914, it is notable as a well-preserved example of early 20th-century commercial architecture in Downtown Albuquerque and includes one of the only remaining cast iron storefronts in the central business district.  The building was added to the New Mexico State Register of Cultural Properties and the National Register of Historic Places in 1980.

History
The Pacific Building was built in 1914 by Andreas Romero, who also owned a butcher shop on the same block. The first tenant was a furniture store, followed by a car dealership from 1918 to 1922 and then a furniture store again. In 1942 the building was bought by the Pacific Desk Company, an office furniture retailer, which remained in business until 1980. Local investors bought the building in 1980 and renovated it as office space in 1981.

Architecture
The Pacific Building is a two-story, rectangular building with a partial basement. The facade is yellow brick with a cast iron storefront, one of the few remaining in the city. The second floor has eight evenly spaced 1/1 sash windows under a pair of cast iron hoods and a stepped parapet. On the ground floor, there are large display windows on either side of a recessed entry. The interior of the building has an open first floor with cast iron columns and an ornate pressed metal ceiling. The second floor had removable partitions installed in the 1940s and was reported to be unused in the 1980s.

References

Buildings and structures in Albuquerque, New Mexico
Commercial buildings completed in 1914
Commercial buildings on the National Register of Historic Places in New Mexico
New Mexico State Register of Cultural Properties
National Register of Historic Places in Albuquerque, New Mexico